The Okwanuchu were one of a number of small Shastan-speaking tribes of Native Americans in Northern California, who were closely related to the adjacent larger Shasta tribe.

Geography
The Okwanuchu occupied territory south, southwest, and southeast of Mount Shasta in California, including the present-day cities of Mount Shasta, California, McCloud, California and Dunsmuir, California; on the upper Sacramento River downstream to North Salt Creek; in the Squaw Valley Creek drainage; and on the upper McCloud River downstream to where it meets Squaw Valley Creek.

Anthropologist Alfred L. Kroeber suggested in 1918 that the Okwanuchu had become extinct.  Very little is known about the location of their villages and settlements, or about their culture, other than a presumed similarity to their Shasta and Achomawi neighbors. The archaeological sites associated with their range date back in excess of 5,000 years.

Language
The Okwanuchu were speakers of the Okwanuchu language, an older Hokan-speaking family of languages. Although their language was closely related to that of the Shasta language of the main Shasta tribe, it contained some elements of Wintu and Achomawi.

Members of the Penutian-speaking family of languages, especially the Wintu, arrived in central Northern California in the vicinity of Redding, California about 1200 years ago, likely from southern Oregon.  The Wintu possessed superior technology, were out-competing their Hokan-language family neighbors, and were expanding Wintu territory at the expense of the Okwanuchu and the Achomawi to the north, and the Yana to the east.  It appears likely that even if Europeans and Americans not intervened (beginning in the 1820s), the Wintu would have absorbed or otherwise eliminated the Okwanuchu over the course of the coming centuries.

See also
Shastan languages

References
 Kroeber, A. L., “Handbook of the Indians of California.”  New York, Dover Publications, 1976.  Reprint. (Written in 1918, originally published as Kroeber, A.L., "Handbook of the Indians of California" (Bureau of American Ethnology Bulletin 78, Washington, D.C., 1925), subsequently reprinted in 1953 and 1976).

External links
Native Tribes, Groups, Language Families and Dialects of California in 1770 (map after Kroeber)
Shasta territory, siskiyous.edu
Shasta tribal history, Access Genealogy

Native American tribes in California
Shasta people
History of Siskiyou County, California
People from Siskiyou County, California
Trinity Mountains (California)